Krinčinas is a small town in Panevėžys County, in northeastern Lithuania. According to the 2011 census, the town has a population of 461 people.

History
On July 26, 1941, 21 Krincinas Jews were massacred in a mass execution perpetrated by Germans in the Zideiko Forest in Pasvalys.

References

Towns in Lithuania
Towns in Panevėžys County
Holocaust locations in Lithuania